The men's decathlon competition at the 2004 Summer Olympics in Athens was held at the Olympic Stadium on 23–24  August.

Competition format
The decathlon consists of ten track and field events, with a points system that awards higher scores for better results in each of the ten components. The athletes all compete in one competition with no elimination rounds.

At the end of competition, if two athletes are tied, the athlete who has received more points in the greater number of events is the winner.

Schedule
All times are Greece Standard Time (UTC+2)

Records
, the existing World and Olympic records were as follows.

Record set during this event

Overall results 
The final results of the event are in the following table.

Key

References

External links
Official Olympic Report

Decathlon
2004
Men's events at the 2004 Summer Olympics